Lee Nailon (born February 22, 1975) is an American professional basketball player who played six seasons in the National Basketball Association (NBA). He was the 2007 Israeli Basketball Premier League MVP. In 2011, he was the top scorer in the Israel Basketball Premier League. He had an All-American college career at Texas Christian University.  In 2022, Lee Nailon became the head basketball coach for Carbondale Community High School in Carbondale, Illinois.

High school career
Nailon was a graduate of South Bend Clay High School where, along with sophomore and former Purdue player, Jaraan Cornell, the two led the Colonials to capture the 1994 Indiana State Championship title, scoring a combined 46 points.

College career
Nailon started his college career playing one year at Southwestern CC (Iowa) before transferring to Butler County CC (Kansas) for his sophomore year then finishing his career playing his final two years (1997-1999) at Texas Christian University where he averaged 23.9 points and 9.1 rebounds, earning first-team WAC All-Conference honors both seasons.

Professional career
Nailon was a second round (43rd overall) pick of the Charlotte Hornets in the 1999 NBA Draft. He has played for the Hornets (in separate stints for both Charlotte and New Orleans franchises in 2000-02 and 2004-05 respectively), the New York Knicks (2002–03), Atlanta Hawks (2003–04), Orlando Magic (2003–04), Cleveland Cavaliers (2003–04) and Philadelphia 76ers (2005–06). Nailon feuded with coach Paul Silas while at Charlotte over minutes played which led to him being released and leaving for the Knicks. Nailon got into multiple confrontations with Silas during a preseason game in 2002 which led to his dismissal. Nailon was recommended to play for the Knicks in a phone call then coach Don Chaney made to Silas. While playing for the Knicks Nailon was frustrated over lack of playing time. He holds NBA career averages of 8.6 points and 3.1 rebounds per game. His international experience includes playing for Adecco Milano in Italy (1999-00), Bnei HaSharon in Israel (2006–07; 2010–11), Lokomotiv Novosibirsk in Russia (2007–08), Al-Riyadi in Lebanon, Leones de Ponce (2009) and Piratas de Quebradillas in Puerto Rico (2010).

In the 2006–07 season, Nailon led Bnei HaSharon to the Israeli Cup final, shocking the champions, Maccabi Tel Aviv, in the semifinal (eventually losing to Hapoel Jerusalem in the final). He was named the 2007 Israeli Basketball Premier League MVP.

Nailon re-signed with Bnei HaSharon on August 1, 2010. In 2011, he was the top scorer in the Israel Basketball Premier League.

In 2018, Nailon was drafted 6th overall by the Ghost Ballers of the United States-based BIG3.

Career statistics

NBA

Regular season

|-
| align="left" | 2000-01
| align="left" | Charlotte
| 42 || 0 || 11.2 || .485 || .000 || .744 || 2.2 || .6 || .21 || .12 || 3.9
|-
| align="left" | 2001-02
| align="left" | Charlotte
| 79 || 41 || 24.2 || .483 || .500 || .747 || 3.7 || 1.2 || .75 || .22 || 10.8
|-
| align="left" | 2002-03
| align="left" | New York
| 38 || 0 || 10.7 || .442 || .000 || .824 || 1.8 || .7 || .16 || .08 || 5.5
|-
| align="left" | 2003-04
| align="left" | Atlanta
| 27 || 0 || 11.1 || .457 || .000 || .842 || 2.3 || .6 || .37 || .26 || 5.3
|-
| align="left" | 2003-04
| align="left" | Orlando
| 8 || 0 || 10.4 || .407 || .000 || .778 || 1.8 || .5 || .13 || .00 || 3.6
|-
| align="left" | 2003-04
| align="left" | Cleveland
| 22 || 4 || 18.0 || .451 || .000 || .800 || 3.0 || .8 || .18 || .05 || 7.7
|-
| align="left" | 2004-05
| align="left" | New Orleans
| 68 || 51 || 29.7 || .478 || .000 || .806 || 4.4 || 1.6 || .53 || .24 || 14.2
|-
| align="left" | 2005-06
| align="left" | Philadelphia
| 22 || 0 || 10.8 || .500 || .000 || .867 || 1.9 || .3 || .36 || .18 || 4.2
|- class="sortbottom"
| style="text-align:center;" colspan="2"| Career
| 306 || 96 || 19.0 || .474 || .111 || .786 || 3.1 || 1.0 || .43 || .10 || 8.6

Playoffs

|-
| style="text-align:left;"|2002
| style="text-align:left;"|Charlotte
| 9 || 1 || 17.8 || .458 || .000 || .789 || 2.7 || .7 || .3 || .0 || 7.7

References

External links
NBA.com Profile - Lee Nailon
Basketball Reference Profile
Safsal.co.il Profile

• https://www.1035espn.com/2022/05/20/carbondale-community-high-school-announces-lee-nailon-as-their-next-head-boys-basketball/

1975 births
Living people
20th-century African-American sportspeople
21st-century African-American sportspeople
African-American basketball players
All-American college men's basketball players
Al Riyadi Club Beirut basketball players
American expatriate basketball people in Argentina
American expatriate basketball people in Hungary
American expatriate basketball people in Israel
American expatriate basketball people in Italy
American expatriate basketball people in Lebanon
American expatriate basketball people in Mexico
American expatriate basketball people in Russia
American expatriate basketball people in South Korea
American men's 3x3 basketball players
American men's basketball players
Atlanta Hawks players
Atomerőmű SE players
Basketball players from South Bend, Indiana
Big3 players
Bnei HaSharon players
Butler Grizzlies men's basketball players
Charlotte Hornets draft picks
Charlotte Hornets players
Cleveland Cavaliers players
Estudiantes de Bahía Blanca basketball players
Goyang Carrot Jumpers players
Leones de Ponce basketball players
Israeli Basketball Premier League players
New Orleans Hornets players
New York Knicks players
Orlando Magic players
Panteras de Aguascalientes players
Philadelphia 76ers players
Piratas de Quebradillas players
Power forwards (basketball)
Small forwards
TCU Horned Frogs men's basketball players